Liberation is the eighth studio album by American singer-songwriter Christina Aguilera. The album was released on June 15, 2018, through RCA Records.  It is Aguilera's first studio album in six years, following her seventh studio album Lotus (2012). The singer started recording the album in late 2014, and throughout 2015 and 2017, Aguilera collaborated with a handful of producers and songwriters to reach her desired sound; Pharrell Williams and Linda Perry were in the studio in early stages and ended up not being on the album, while new collaborators such as Anderson .Paak, Kanye West, Che Pope, Mike Dean and Tayla Parx were confirmed to be on the album. It features collaborations with Demi Lovato, Keida, Shenseea, GoldLink, Ty Dolla Sign, 2 Chainz, and XNDA.

Liberation was preceded by the singles "Accelerate", "Fall in Line" and "Like I Do", and the promotional single, "Twice". Critical reception towards the album was generally positive, with music critics complimenting Aguilera's vocals, the album's experimental styles, and the cohesive sound. Commercially, it positioned within the top ten in eight countries, including the United States, peaking at number six on the Billboard 200 chart. It also reached number one in Spain, number three in Switzerland, and number five in Canada.

The album's second and third singles "Fall in Line" featuring Demi Lovato and "Like I Do" featuring GoldLink, earned nominations for Best Pop Duo/Group Performance and Best Rap/Sung Performance at the 61st Grammy Awards, respectively. To promote the album, Aguilera embarked on her fifth concert tour, The Liberation Tour, beginning in September 2018. It was her first tour in nearly ten years after the Back to Basics Tour. Liberation was nominated for the International Album of the Year award at the 2018 GAFFA Awards ceremony.

Background and development
Following the release of her seventh album Lotus (2012), Aguilera took a career hiatus to focus on her family. Later in October 2015, Aguilera confirmed that she was recording two albums: one in English and one in Spanish (which was slated to be her second after 2000's Mi Reflejo). During the interview, she also elaborated on the album's working process, saying: "I've been loosely working and sort of accumulating ideas for what my next album will be over the last couple of years. I'm excited for my fans to finally be getting something from me — it's been a while!" In 2016, she returned to The Voice season ten, winning the series with her contestant Alisan Porter, making Aguilera the first female coach to win the series. During a promotional interview for the TV show, Aguilera stated about the album: "It will be an album of freedom."

On June 16, 2016, Aguilera released the song "Change", dedicated to the victims of the Orlando nightclub shooting, while on August 23, 2016, she released "Telepathy" for the TV series The Get Down soundtrack, which topped the Billboard Dance Club Songs chart. In February 2018, media reported that Aguilera was collaborating with Demi Lovato who confirmed a collaboration. In March 2018, a low-quality snippet of a song called "Masochist" leaked online, as well as the full-length demo of the song "Fall in Line", which prompted rumors that the tracks were supposed to be on the album. On May 3, 2018, Aguilera released the first single "Accelerate" featuring American singer Ty Dolla Sign and rapper 2 Chainz, as well as its music video, while also confirming the album's title, Liberation, and its art, track listing and announced the album was available for pre-order online.

Recording

Recording for the album initially took place in early 2014. At early stages, the first producer that was confirmed to be working with Aguilera was Pharrell Williams, which according to the singer, had one song that she loved. In 2015, Aguilera confirmed that she was still writing and gathering songs for the album to eventually record them. In late November 2015, Aguilera confirmed she was working again with long time collaborator Linda Perry. In February 2017, Aguilera claimed she was adding the final touches to the album, however in the same month, Tayla Parx confirmed she had worked with Aguilera, as well as Da Internz, Kanye West and PartyNextDoor. Billboard would later reveal that Aguilera met West in Rick Rubin's Shangri La studio in Malibu, California, a few months before West released The Life of Pablo in 2016. About West, she commented: "I've always been a huge fan of Kanye. Outside of, you know, his controversial aspects, I just think he's a great artist and musicmaker and beatmaker. The artists that he chooses to pluck from different walks of life are so interesting." He produced "Accelerate" as well as "Maria", which is Aguilera's personal favorite.

Later in September 2017, Aguilera entered the studio again to work with Mark Ronson and Anderson .Paak. Aguilera also mentioned about working with Paak, which produced two tracks, by saying: "He and I connected big-time. He was like, 'I used to watch you on TRL!' He's a great lyricist, soul singer and rapper. And he murders the drums." Billboard also revealed that Liberation would have a collaboration with Demi Lovato, which was in the same song co-written by singer and songwriter Julia Michaels. Commenting about choosing Lovato, Aguilera claimed: "We went through a few names of women. I needed a belty singer, and she took it to the next level. I almost cried when I first heard her on the record." American singer and songwriter Jon Bellion confirmed in a now-deleted tweet that he is the producer behind "Fall in Line". The singer revealed that during the album's working process she regretted not having Cardi B and Childish Gambino on the album; the first "got lost in the shuffle", after being discouraged by a producer to work with her, while the latter was working on the TV series Atlanta and the two never had the time to materialize the collaboration. It was reported in the media in June 2018 that Formula One driver Lewis Hamilton had performed on the track "Pipe", under the name XNDA. Hamilton did not initially confirm this, but confirmed the rumors in July 2020.

In August 2018, Aguilera revealed that she recorded "a lot more" songs during the Liberation studio sessions, and they could end up on her follow-up album. A demo of a Spanglish song "Lolita"—recorded in 2017 and co-written by Tayla Parx—leaked in February 2021.

Music and lyrics

Liberation is a pop, R&B and hip hop record, with soul, reggae, trap, Southern rock and dancehall elements. It was described as a "hip-hop and R&B inspired" album by Billboard. Aguilera commented: "To me, there's nothing like an amazing hip-hop beat," while also claiming: "At the end of the day, I am a soul singer. When you strip back the words 'pop star' and the many things that I've done, singing soulfully is where my core, my root and my heart really is. And as you can see, it's what I'm inspired by." The New York Timess chief critic Jon Pareles noted that on the album Aguilera largely concentrates on such themes as "trauma, lust, resistance, obsession and, finally, lasting love."

Billboard described the third track, "Maria", as "a pulsing, intricately orchestrated piece that includes a Michael Jackson sample and an extended introduction in which Aguilera sings from The Sound of Music." Aguilera commented that the influence behind the title was Julie Andrews' character in the film as well, as her middle name, adding: "Within my house a form of escape for me was opening my bedroom's window and singing out to the world pretending that I was her. It's about getting back to that little girl who just wants to sing for all the right reasons, not necessarily for charting and all the things that this business kind of does to you over the years and shaping how you look at making music." On "Maria", Aguilera adapts a "bluesy lower range" and sings about existential misery. It is followed by a "funky rock-driven" track titled "Sick of Sittin'", which features hard-rock guitar riffs and was inspired by the music of Janis Joplin. The song's lyrics were characterized as "thrillingly acerbic" by The Guardian'''s Alim Kheraj, and Aguilera explained that they "were born out of feeling stagnant in one place for too long, feeling a little asleep at the wheel. Anytime that you get just too comfortable in a place where you just feel that you're not living up to your full potential it's time to flip the script and move."

The introduction to "Fall in Line", the duet with Lovato, is the track "Dreamers", which "features a group of young girls declaring goals like 'I want to be a journalist,' 'I want to be heard,' 'I want to be president.'" "Fall in Line" has been described as a feminist anthem. Aguilera stated that the track was recorded a few years ago and before movements such as Time's Up and the Me Too movement came out. She added: "It was the song that needed to be heard. Because of what I witnessed when I was growing up I always felt really driven to have a voice that my mom kind of never had in my childhood. So I've always wanted to be that advocate for women and anybody that was struggling to have their own voice."

Title and artwork
About the title of the album Aguilera explained, "I wanted to have a title that meant freeing myself from anything that wasn't my truth. That's a constant I think in everyone's life: every time you feel stifled in a current situation where you feel you're not quite yourself or being bogged down by other people's opinions. Or when you feel like you're stuck in a stagnant place."

On the May 2018 cover of Paper magazine, Aguilera appeared bare-faced without makeup and retouching, saying "I'm at the place, even musically, where it's a liberating feeling to be able to strip it all back and appreciate who you are and your raw beauty." The similar photography style was chosen for the Liberation artwork—posing with a natural look, Aguilera is seen in closeup. The cover of the standard edition was revealed on Aguilera's website on May 3, 2018.

Release and promotion

On April 28, 2018, Aguilera had a concert at Formula 1 Azerbaijan Grand Prix where she unveiled a promo video as an intro for the upcoming album. On May 3, 2018, Liberations release date in the United States was confirmed to be June 15, and a teaser trailer titled Liberation: Where's Maria? was released on May 4, in which the singer spoke about her inspiration and the concept of the album. On May 9, 2018, Aguilera announced she will embark on The Liberation Tour to support the album, which is her first tour since 2006's Back to Basics Tour. Aguilera performed "Fall in Line" with Lovato at the 2018 Billboard Music Awards on May 20, 2018. The singer partnered with Pandora and held an album listening session on May 31, 2018, at The Peppermint Club. On June 13, 2018, Aguilera made a surprise performance in disguise in a New York City subway alongside Jimmy Fallon, where she performed Aretha Franklin's "Think" and her own "Fighter". The performance was taped and broadcast the next night on The Tonight Show Starring Jimmy Fallon, where she was interviewed and performed and "Fall in Line". The next day, she performed on Today Show and was interviewed on Total Request Live. On September 12, Aguilera was interviewed on Jimmy Kimmel Live!. Several songs from Liberation made it onto the set list of Aguilera's Las Vegas residency Christina Aguilera: The Xperience (2019-2020). When on a break from the residency, Aguilera embarked on another tour in support of the album, The X Tour, throughout 2019. The X Tour promoted Liberation in Europe and Mexico across 18 dates.

Singles
"Accelerate" featuring singer Ty Dolla Sign and rapper 2 Chainz was released on May 3, 2018, as the lead single from the album. The music video premiered on Aguilera's Vevo channel on the same day. It reached number-one on the Billboard Dance Club Songs chart for the issue dated September 1, 2018, becoming Aguilera's tenth song to do so, as well as Ty Dolla Sign and 2 Chainz's first number-one song. On May 11, 2018, "Twice" was released as a promotional single from the album. "Fall in Line" featuring singer-songwriter Demi Lovato was released on May 16, 2018, as the second official single from Liberation. A lyric video was uploaded on Aguilera's Vevo channel on the same day, while the music video premiered on May 23, 2018. A week prior the album release, on June 7, 2018, "Like I Do" featuring rapper GoldLink was released as the third single.
 The lyric video for the song was released on June 21, 2018.

Critical receptionLiberation received positive reviews from critics. At Metacritic, which assigns a normalized rating out of 100 to reviews from mainstream critics, Liberation has an average score of 71 based on 17 reviews, indicating "generally favorable reviews". Alim Kheraj from The Observer lauded the album for being "at her most artistically emancipated". Brittany Spanos of Rolling Stone labelled the album "Xtina at her peak" and claimed that Aguilera's "greatest attributes is that she has rarely played it safe". Mesfin Fekadu found the album "masterfully cohesive" in The Washington Post, while comparing it to Mariah Carey's The Emancipation of Mimi, "her 2005 comeback album that reminded the world to never count out the diva". The New York Times critic Jon Pareles complimented the album's experimental styles incorporating various genres and wrote that "[Aguilera's] extravagant vocal flourishes connect with sweeping emotion". HipHopDX writer Trent Clark opined that despite "occasional cheese-smothered lyric", the album featured Aguilera's "heavenly" vocals that was "a well-calculated offering from a living legend whose abilities are still very much intact". Stephen Thomas Erlewine from AllMusic discussed that while Liberation appeared to be personal, it still "resonate emotionally" despite not being "an easy route". Claire Lobenfeld from Pitchfork, while unimpressed towards the album's "progressive moments" like "Pipe" or "Accelerate", claimed that the album's "sturdy moments" as on "Fall in Line" created "a promising first step toward a genuine pop rebirth—moments" that were comparable to Janet Jackson's The Velvet Rope or Whitney Houston's My Love Is Your Love.

Nick Levine from NME commented that while Liberation "may lack the grand ambition and massive pop bangers of her glory days", the album was "cohesive and surprisingly low-key" that may revitalize Aguilera's career. The Daily Telegraphs Neil McCormick, by contrast, disapproved of the album's music styles incorporating "rock, R&B, soul, hip hop, reggaeton and anthemic balladry" that "never settles into a coherent listening experience". Sal Cinquemani from Slant Magazine shared a similar viewpoint, commenting that the album lacked cohesion by being both "forward-minded" and "frustratingly safe". BuzzFeed editor, Dylan Nguyen, called it "a throwback to Stripped", and praised its "amazing songwriting" and modern sound.

The Rock and Roll Hall of Fame member George Clinton complimented the album track "Sick of Sittin'", calling it Funkadelic-inspired, as well as praising its "vibe" and production. At the 2018 GAFFA Awards, Liberation was nominated for the International Album of the Year award. It was also nominated for the International Album of the Year at the 2018 Luvpop Awards.

 Year-end lists 

"Unless It's with You" was ranked 23rd best song of 2018 by Rolling Stone.

Commercial performance
In the United States, Liberation debuted at number six on the Billboard 200 chart, selling 68,000 album-equivalent units, becoming Aguilera's second lowest-peaking and lowest-selling record in the United States. It became Aguilera's seventh top 10 album in the nation, and was the highest ranked solo female album on the week ending June 30. Liberation was also the third best-selling album of the week. Furthermore, the release saw Aguilera re-enter and peak at number eight on the Billboard Artist 100 chart. The album spent two weeks on the chart, falling ninety-two spots to number ninety-eight in its second week before leaving the chart in its third week. On the Canadian Albums Chart compiled by Billboard, the record debuted and peaked at number five, becoming her highest charting album since Bionic and overall, her fifth album that peaks inside the top-five.Liberation debuted and peaked at number 17 on the UK Albums Chart with sales of 4,834 copies, the week's fifth highest debut, and second highest debut outside the top 10. In Australia, the album debuted at number 9 on the Australian Albums Chart, becoming her fourth top 10 album and earning her highest charting studio effort since Bionic. Elsewhere, it became Aguilera's highest-charting album in Spain, entering the Spanish Albums Chart at number 1. It also became her third top 10 album, following Back to Basics and Bionic. In Switzerland, Liberation debuted and peaked at number three on the Swiss Albums, becoming her fifth consecutive top 10 album and also spending a total of seven weeks on the chart. In Austria, it entered the Austrian Albums at number nine, her highest charting album since Bionic. Subsequently, Liberation stayed on the chart for a total of three weeks.

Track listing

Notes
 signifies a co-producer
 signifies an additional producer
 signifies a vocal producer for Demi Lovato
 "Maria" contains a sample of "Maria (You Were the Only One)", written by Lawrence Brown, Linda Glover, Horgay Gordy and Allen Story, as performed by Michael Jackson.
 "Sick of Sittin'" contains a sample of "No Registration", written and performed by Janne Schaffer.
 "Accelerate" contains a sample of "I Like Funky Music" by Uncle Louie, and "I Feel So Good Inside", written by Ronald Brown, as performed by The Techniques IV.
 In July 2020, it was revealed that the rapper credited as XNDA on "Pipe" (track 13) was actually Formula 1 race driver Lewis Hamilton who opted to record his vocals under the pseudonym.

Personnel
Credits adapted from the liner notes of Liberation''.

Performers and musicians

Christina Aguilera – vocals (all tracks)
Demi Lovato – vocals (track 6)
 Keida – vocals, additional vocals (track 7)
Shenseea – vocals, additional vocals (track 7)
GoldLink – vocals (track 8)
Ty Dolla $ign – vocals (track 12)
2 Chainz – vocals (track 12)
XNDA – vocals (track 13)
Ilsey Juber – background vocals (tracks 3, 14)
Anderson .Paak – background vocals (tracks 4, 11)
Jon Bellion – background vocals (track 6)
Audra Mae – background vocals, additional vocals (track 6)
Tayla Parx – background vocals (tracks 7, 13)
Lauren Evans – background vocals (track 15)
 Elizabeth Komba – background vocals (track 15)
MNEK – additional vocals (track 9)
 Kirby Lauryen – additional vocals (track 12)
Nicholas Britell – piano (track 1), strings arranger (track 3)
Tim Fain – violin (track 1)
 Rob Moose – violin (track 3), viola (tracks 1, 3), octave bass viola (track 3)
 Jairus "J MO" Mozee – guitar (track 4)
 Ryan Svendsen – trumpet & flugelhorn (track 6)
 Bryan "Composer" Nelson – all instruments (track 7)
 Darhyl "Hey DJ" Camper Jr – all instruments (track 14)
Tim Anderson – all instruments (track 14)
Ricky Reed – guitar (track 15)
 Carlitos del Puetro – bass (track 15)
 Vinnie Colaiuta – drums (track 15)
Rogét Chahayed – piano (track 15)

Production

 Christina Aguilera – executive production, production (track 11), A&R
Keith Naftaly – A&R
 Nicholas Britell – production (track 1)
Kanye West – production (tracks 3, 12)
Che Pope – production (tracks 3, 12, 13), co-production (track 7)
Hudson Mohawke – co-production (track 3)
 Noah Goldstein – co-production (track 3), additional production (track 12)
 Anderson .Paak – production (tracks 4, 8)
 Mell Beats – production (track 4)
 Jon Bellion – production (track 6)
 Mark Williams – co-production (track 6)
 Raul Cubina – co-production (track 6)
Mitch Allan – vocal production for Demi Lovato (track 6)
 Bryan "Composer" Nelson – production (track 7)
 Kosine – production (track 7)
 BRLLNT – co-production (track 8)
Dumbfoundead – additional production (track 8)
 MNEK – production (track 9)
 Kirby Lauryen – production (track 10)
 Sandy Chila – additional production (track 10)
Mike Dean – production (track 12)
Charlie Heat – co-production (track 12)
Da Honorable C.N.O.T.E. – co-production (track 12)
 Eric Danchick – additional production (track 12)
Sango – production (track 13)
Neenyo – production (track 13)
 Darhyl "Hey DJ" Camper Jr – production (track 14)
 Tim Anderson  – production (track 14)
 Ricky Reed – production (track 15)

Technical

 Oscar Ramirez – vocals engineering (tracks 2–4, 7-11, 13–15), Christina Aguilera vocals engineering (tracks 6,  12)
 Noah Goldstein – engineering (tracks 3, 12)
 Jonathan Simpson – recording (track 6)
 Scott Robinson – additional vocal engineering (track 6)
 Bryan "Composer" Nelson – programming (track 7)
 MNEK – engineering (track 9)
 Pro Logic – XNDA vocals recording (track 13)
 Darhyl "Hey DJ" Camper Jr – programming (track 14)
 Tim Anderson  – programming, engineering (track 14)
 Bill Malina – engineering (track 15)

Artwork

 Brian Roettinger – art direction & design
 Milan Zrnic – photography (cover, back cover, pages 2, 3, 5, 10 and 16)
 Luke Gilford – photography (pages 4, 8–9)
 Lea Colombo – photography (pages 6–7)

Charts

Release history

References

External links
 

2018 albums
Albums produced by Jon Bellion
Albums produced by Mike Dean (record producer)
Albums produced by Honorable C.N.O.T.E.
Albums produced by Kanye West
Albums produced by MNEK
Christina Aguilera albums
RCA Records albums
Hip hop albums by American artists